= National Volunteer Caregiving Network =

The National Volunteer Caregiving Network is a network of interfaith, volunteer caregiving service providers with hundreds of locations throughout the United States. It was initiated by the Robert Wood Johnson Foundation, a national charity dedicated to improving the health and health care of Americans, headquartered in Princeton, New Jersey. The purpose was to provide start-up monies to create community volunteer programs across the country to serve people who are isolated or homebound due to long-term health conditions as the result of old age and/or disability. The initial grants were made in 1984. Over the course of twenty years, more than 1,500 local programs were funded and many continue to serve people with long-term health conditions.

A major focus of the network is provision of volunteer assistance to those who need assistance with normal, everyday activities due to a health condition. The network is a privately funded program developed and supported by a private foundation – not by the government. Its volunteers come from churches, synagogues, mosques and other houses of worship, as well as the community at large. Volunteers help people by providing non-medical assistance with tasks such as providing a ride to the doctor, visiting with people on a regular basis and helping with grocery shopping or home maintenance.

== Timeline ==
- 1984 – Robert Wood Johnson Foundation funds 25 pilot programs involving “interfaith volunteer caregiving” for people with chronic health conditions.
- 1993 – The Foundation expands the program and awards $35,000 grants to create 1,091 new local Faith in Action programs from 1993 to 1999.
- 2000 – The Foundation announces an additional expansion, and funds 599 more programs from 2000 to 2003.
- 2003 – Singer and actress Della Reese becomes national spokesperson for Faith in Action.
- 2004 – The basic grant program is discontinued, but grants of up to $75,000 are provided to 15 regional/state-wide “collaboratives” of existing Faith in Action programs.
- 2005 – The Robert Wood Johnson Foundation announces that effective July 1, 2008, it will complete its support for Faith in Action and transition the national program to local ownership—looking to congregations, community agencies and local philanthropies to provide ongoing support.
- 2008 – An independent national membership network of Faith in Action programs is formed to provide continuing support after the close of the Faith in Action National Program Office. As of April, there are 629 active Faith in Action programs nationwide.
- 2009 – Terrance Keenan, the pioneer of partnerships between local health and faith-based organizations to improve and expand volunteer care-giving for chronically ill patients, an idea that became the Faith in Action program, dies.
- 2011 – Faith in Action National Network changes name to become National Volunteer Caregiving Network (NVCN)
- 2012 – Six new volunteer caregiving programs were launched in California, funding for NVCN to provide technical assistance and produce a Start-Up guide were provided by the SCAN Foundation.
